J. Palmer O'Neil (September 30, 1843 – January 6, 1908) was a businessman and an executive for the  Pittsburgh Alleghenys baseball organization.

Early life
O'Neil was born in Ulster County, New York.

Career
O'Neil worked for years as a life insurance executive in New York City and Pittsburgh, followed by a stint as a manufacturer of gun and hunting supplies.

He later took over as president of what would become the Pirates baseball organization. He is known for his work in helping to financially shepherd the team through the 1890 season, when the club set a league record for losses in a season while facing competition from the upstart Players League team, the Pittsburgh Burghers.

O'Neil died in 1908.

References

Pittsburgh Alleghenys managers
1844 births
1908 deaths
Burials at Allegheny Cemetery